Lord of the Lost is a German industrial metal band from Hamburg, formed by singer and frontman Chris Harms. They are set to represent Germany in the Eurovision Song Contest 2023 with the song "Blood & Glitter".

History 
Lord of the Lost was founded in mid-2007 by Chris Harms as a solo project. While working on the initial songs and publishing them on MySpace, Harms received a lot of positive reception and realized that he would require a full band to play them live. He recruited other musicians from his friends in the Hamburg music scene to form the band and begin working on the first album. Harms originally called the project Lord, but changed the name of the band to Lord of the Lost to avoid possible name disputes with Lordi and The Lords. Before Lord of the Lost, Harms was a singer and guitarist of the rock band Philiae (1999–2004), a guitarist and second singer with the glam metal band The Pleasures (2004–2007), as well as a musician on various projects like Big Boy and Unterart.

The debut single Dry the Rain was released in 2009 and the debut album Fears was released in 2010 with the independent label Out of Line. While recording the second album Antagony Lord of the Lost went on an extended tour through 2010 which included international shows and festivals such as the Wave-Gotik-Treffen, the Wacken Open Air and the M'era Luna Festival.

In spring 2011, the band released Sex on Legs as the first single from their second album, Antagony. The album, considered their first concept album, was released shortly thereafter. Lord of the Lost toured in support of the album with the band Mono Inc. on their Viva Hades tour.

In summer 2012, Lord of the Lost released their third album Die Tomorrow. Just before the release, the band began working on their fourth album From the Flame into the Fire. In October 2012, Lord of the Lost opened for Letzte Instanz on their Ewig-Tour. Lord of the Lost started touring again in the spring of 2013 co-headlining on the Darkness Kills tour with Unzucht, and in September kicked off the We Are the Lost tour together with Lost Area. In October 2013, Lord of the Lost appeared as part of the Gothic Meets Klassik at the Leipzig Gewandhaus with the Zielona Gòra Symphony Orchestra.

In February 2014, drummer Christian Schellhorn left the band and was replaced by Tobias Mertens. In March 2014, the band played their first US tour, which was financed by crowdfunding. Within two months fans and sponsors raised US $12,775, surpassing the original goal of US $10,000.

In March 2015, Lord of the Lost released the pure acoustic album Swan Songs, which reached number 34 on the GfK Entertainment Charts. The live performances for the album took place on the Out of Line Weekender in Berlin in the same month.

In 2015, Lord of the Lost released the EP Full Metal Whore. The tour for the album used the motto "Make Love Make War" and was supported by the bands Darkhaus, Eyes Shut Tight, Vlad in Tears, and Erdling. In December 2015, they released A Night to Remember – Live Acoustic in Hamburg, the DVD and live CD from the acoustic tour during the previous spring.

The first single "The Love of God" from the album Empyrean was released in May 2016. This was followed by the band's first major European tour Make Europe Great Again (M.E.G.A.) with Combichrist, Filter, and (at the German concerts) Rabia Sorda. Empyrean was published at the end of July 2016 and is the second concept album from the band.

The band followed Empyrean with their open air concert premiere as The Lord of the Lost Ensemble, an acoustic-classical band supported by classical musicians and the former drummer Christian "Disco" Schellhorn.

In December 2016, guitarist Bo Six announced that he would be leaving the band for professional and private reasons. In early January 2017, the band announced their new guitarist π (Pi).

In July 2017, Tobias Mertens announced that, for private and professional reasons, he would be taking a time-out from Lord of the Lost. Niklas Kahl has stepped in as drummer for live performances.

Lord of the Lost performed with KMFDM on the United Kingdom leg of KMFDM's "Hell Yeah" tour with Inertia during September 2017. The band planned to join KMFDM on the United States portion of the "Hell Yeah" tour with ohGr starting in October 2017. Chris Harms and π were to be playing guitar on stage with KMFDM during the tour, in addition to their Lord of the Lost set. Lord of the Lost was forced to withdraw from KMFDM's United States tour when they were not issued visas by the U.S. government.

Iron Maiden's Steve Harris personally picked Lord of the Lost to support Iron Maiden on their 2020 European leg of the Legacy of the Beast World Tour but due to the COVID-19 pandemic restrictions, the tour had to be cancelled. The tour was rescheduled and in 2022, Lord of the Lost played as a support act in 17 European cities on Iron Maiden's Legacy of the Beast world tour and gained much recognition. Iron Maiden subsequently renewed this successful collaboration for the European leg of the 2023 The Future Past world tour.

In December 2022, Lord of the Lost surprised their fans by releasing their new studio album "Blood and Glitter" months before it was scheduled to be released. The album, in spite of the last to the minute release and lack of pre-promotion, managed to hit Nr. 1 on the official German Music Charts.

With the song "Blood and Glitter", Lord of the Lost won , and will thus represent Germany in the Eurovision Song Contest 2023.

Musical style and influences 
Lord of the Lost produces music across several genres including heavy metal and glam rock-influenced dark rock, industrial music, and classical music. In interviews with the magazine Orkus and the website Subexistance, Chris Harms has cited bands and musicians such as Rammstein, Nine Inch Nails, Marilyn Manson and Lady Gaga as some of the many performers that he listens to and is influenced by.

Reception 
Although it has not always been received as highly innovative, the debut album Fears received an overall positive critique by the music press. The music Magazine Sonic Seducer praised not only the "pleasant deep promising vocals" but also the "dark, melodramatic moments" and described the album as "dark mélange of music styles which give the album a fresh and great variety". In Zillo the debut has been described as "not really original or ground-breaking" but it has been praised for its "hard and unconditional songs". Orkus, however, wrote that they have waited a long time for an album "so interesting and rich in variety". Metal.de described the album as "absolutely okay" but suggested to listen to some songs before buying the album because it might be "too hard for some, and too soft for others".

Members 
Members of the band often, but not always, adopt stage names which appear in the credits for the band. If known, the artist's given name is listed after the stage name in parenthesis.

Current members

 Chris "The Lord" Harms – vocals, guitar, cello (2007–present)
 Class Grenayde (Klaas Helmecke) – bass (2008–present)
 Gared Dirge (Gerrit Heinemann) – piano, synthesizer, percussion, guitar, theremin (2010–present)
 π (Pi Stoffers) – guitar (2016–present)
 Niklas Kahl – drums (2017–present)

Previous members
 Sensai (Stefan Ehrhardt) – guitar (2008–2010)
 Sebsta Lindström (Sebastian Makowski) – guitar (2008–2011)
 Any Wayst (Anika) – drums (2008–2011)
 Bo Six (Borislav Crnogorac) – guitar (2009–2016)
 Disco (Christian Schellhorn) – drums (2012–2014)
 Tobias Mertens – drums (2014–2017)

Discography

Studio albums

Orchestra albums

Live albums

Compilation albums

Extended plays

Singles 
 2009: "Dry the Rain"
 2011: "Sex On Legs"
 2012: "Die Tomorrow"
 2013: "See You Soon" incl. "Von Anfang an" (with Holly Loose of Letzte Instanz)
 2014: "Afterlife"
 2014: "La Bomba"
 2014: "Six Feet Underground"
 2016: "The Love of God"
 2017: "Waiting for You to Die"
 2017: "Lighthouse"
 2017: "The Broken Ones"
 2018: "On This Rock I Will Build My Church"
 2018: "Morgana"
 2019: "Loreley"
 2019: "Voodoo Doll"
 2020: "A One Ton Heart"
 2020: "A Splintered Mind"
 2020: "Dying On the Moon" (feat. Joy Frost)
 2021: "The Death of All Colours"
 2021: "Priest"
 2021: "For They Know Not What They Do"
 2022: "Not My Enemy"
 2022: "The Heartbeat of the Devil"
 2022: "Blood & Glitter"
 2023: "Absolute Attitude"

DVDs 
 2012: Black to the Roots
 2014: One Night - Lord of the Lost & The Zielona Góra Symphony Orchestra - Live in Leipzig
 2015: A Night to Remember – Live Acoustic in Hamburg

Exclusive sampler contributions 
 2011: "Do You Wanna Die Without a Scar" (on the Sonic Seducer sampler Cold Hands Seduction Vol. 117)
 2011: "Death Doesn't Kill You But I Do" (on the Out of Line sampler Awake the Machines, Vol. 7)

Remixes and recordings with other artists 

 2011: "Temple of Love" with Latexxx Teens
 2012: "Kannst du mich seh'n" (Remix) for Staubkind
 2012: "Deine Zeit Läuft Ab" (St. Pauli Symphonic Version by Lord of the Lost) for Unzucht
 2012: "Eye M the Blacksheep" (Remix by Chris Harms and Corvin Bahn) for Rabia Sorda
 2012: "Eisblumen" on the Anniversary Sampler for the 20th anniversary of Subway to Sally
 2012: "Deep Inside" (Remix) for Fragile Child
 2013: "Perfect Day" with A Life Divided
 2013: "Bitte Schlag Mich" (shattered by Lord of the Lost) for Ost+Front
 2013: "Pandora's Box" (Cover) for Solitary Experiments
 2013: "In My Darkest Hour" with Mono Inc. on their Nimmermehr tour album
 2014: "Für Immer" Remix for Subway to Sally (on the Sonic Seducer Sampler Medieval Special Vol. XII Issue 03/2014)
 2014: "Krieger" with Blutengel on their Black Symphonies (An Orchestral Journey) Ltd. Edition
 2014: "Die Erde Brennt" Remix Joachim Witt on the Neumond Ltd. Edition
 2014: "Sonne, Mond & Todesstern" (Remix by Lord of the Lost) for Ost+Front
 2015: "Der Zeitdieb" Remix for Tanzwut
 2015: "Der Luftschiffharpunist" Remix for Coppelius
 2015: "Satans Fall" cover for Saltatio Mortis
 2015: "All the Things You Say" Remix for Solar Fake
 2015: "This Misery" with Meinhard
 2016: "Devil or Angel" with Rocksin
 2016: "Ein Wort fliegt wie ein Stein" with Unzucht on their "Neuntöter" deluxe edition
 2016: "MRS. Strong" with 5th Avenue
 2016: "Freak Parade" with Hell Boulevard"
 2016: "Sexschuss" remix for Heldmaschine
 2016: "Children of the Dark" with Tilo Wolff, Joachim Witt and Mono Inc.
 2018: "1000 Seelen" with Joachim Witt
 2018: "I Love the Way You Say My Name" with Scarlet Dorn
 2019: "Europa" with Oomph!
 2019: "Island" with Subway to Sally
 2019: "We're All Dead" with Lolita KompleX
 2019: "Magst du Mittelalter?" With Vogelfrey
 2020: "Modern Prometheus" with Pyogenesis
 2021: "Kiss of the Cobra King" with Powerwolf on their Call of the Wild Ltd. Edition
 2022: "In Einsamkeit" with Joachim Witt
 2022: "Mortals" with Sündenrausch
 2022: "Holding On" with Auger
 2022: "Die Sonne scheint" with Reliquiae 
 2022: "Childhood" with Dawn of Destiny
 2022: "Take Me Back" with Psycholies
 2022: "Never Love" with Corlyx

Music videos 

 2009: "Dry the Rain" (director: Nikola Stahl)
 2010: "Last Words" (director: Nikola Stahl)
 2011: "Sex On Legs" (director: Nikola Stahl)
 2011: "Prison" (director: Chris Harms)
 2012: "Beyond Beautiful" (director: Moritz Krebs)
 2012: "Die Tomorrow" (director: Katya Tsyganova)
 2013: "See You Soon" (director: Jasmin Kreft)
 2013: "Credo" (director: Christian Beer)
 2014: "Afterlife" (director: Matteo Fabbiani & Chiara Cerami)
 2014: "La Bomba" (director: Michel Briegel)
 2014: "Six Feet Underground" (director: Matteo Fabbiani & Chiara Cerami)
 2014: "Kingdom Come" (director: Katya Tsyganova)
 2015: "Lost in a Heartbeat" (director: Lisa Morgenstern)
 2015: "Full Metal Whore" (director: Matteo Fabbiani & Chiara Cerami)
 2016: "The Love of God" (director: Harun Hazar)
 2016: "Drag Me to Hell" (director: Michel Briegel)
 2016: "In Silence" (director: Matteo Fabbiani & Chiara Cerami)
 2017: "Raining Stars" (director: Matteo Fabbiani & Chiara Cerami)
 2017: "Waiting for You to Die" (director: Matteo Fabbiani & Chiara Cerami)
 2017: "Lighthouse" (director: Matteo Fabbiani & Chiara Cerami)
 2017: "The Broken Ones" (director: Matteo Fabbiani & Chiara Cerami)
 2017: "My Better Me" (director: Matteo Fabbiani & Chiara Cerami)
 2018: "On This Rock I Will Build My Church" (director: Matteo Fabbiani & Chiara Cerami)
 2018: "Morgana" (director: Matteo Fabbiani & Chiara Cerami)
 2018: "Haythor" (director: Matteo Fabbiani & Chiara Cerami)
 2018: "Black Halo" (director: Matteo Fabbiani & Chiara Cerami)
 2019: "Loreley" (director: Matteo Fabbiani & Chiara Cerami)
 2019: "Voodoo Doll" (director: Matteo Fabbiani & Chiara Cerami)
 2019: "Till Death Us Do Part" (director: Matteo Fabbiani & Chiara Cerami)
 2019: "Ruins" (director: Andrés Villa)
 2020: "Under the Sun" (director: Matteo Fabbiani & Chiara Cera
 2020: "A One Ton Heart" (director: Chris Harms)
 2021: "The Death of All Colours" (director: VDPictures)
 2021: "Priest" (director: VDPictures)
 2021: "For They Know Not What They Do" (director: VDPictures)
 2021: "The Gospel Of Judas" (director: Matteo Fabbiani & Chiara Cerami)
 2021: "Born With A Broken Heart" (director: Life)
 2021: "Viva Vendetta" (director: Matteo Fabbiani & Chiara Cerami)
 2021: "My Constellation" (director: Matteo Fabbiani & Chiara Cerami)
 2022: "The Heartbeat Of The Devil" (director: Matteo Fabbiani & Chiara Cerami)
 2022: "Blood & Glitter" (director: Matteo Fabbiani & Chiara Cerami)
 2023: "Leave Your Hate In The Comments" (director: Lennard Schmitt)
 2023: "Leaving The Planet Earth" (director: Matteo Fabbiani & Chiara Cerami)
 2023: "Absolute Attitude" (director: Martin Fischer)

References

External links 

 Official website
 Lord of the Lost YouTube Channel
 The Hungarian Fan Page of Lord of the Lost

German gothic metal musical groups
German industrial metal musical groups
Dark rock groups
Eurovision Song Contest entrants for Germany
Eurovision Song Contest entrants of 2023